Thomas Greilinger (born August 6, 1981, in Deggendorf) is German professional ice hockey forward. He currently plays for Deggendorfer SC of the Oberliga.

Career
Greilinger made his Deutsche Eishockey Liga debut during the 1999–00 playoffs with the Munich Barons. The following season he played with the SERC Wild Wings. Greilinger played three seasons with the Nuermberg Ice Tigers before joining ERC Ingolstadt in 2008.

Greilinger played with Ingolstadt for the next 11 seasons, before opting to leave the DEL following the 2018–19 season, agreeing to continue and close out his playing career with hometown club, Deggendorfer SC. In doing so, Greilinger dropped two tiers to the third-tier Oberliga, following Deggendorfer's relegation from DEL2 the previous season.

Greilinger was selected to play for the German national team for the 2010 Winter Olympics.

Career statistics

Regular season and playoffs

International

References

External links
 

1981 births
Living people
Adler Mannheim players
Deggendorfer SC players
ERC Ingolstadt players
German ice hockey forwards
Ice hockey players at the 2010 Winter Olympics
München Barons players
Nürnberg Ice Tigers players
Olympic ice hockey players of Germany
People from Deggendorf (district)
Sportspeople from Lower Bavaria
Schwenninger Wild Wings players